Dobashi Station may refer to:

 Dobashi Station (Ehime), a railway station on the Gunchū Line in Matsuyama, Ehime Prefecture, Japan
 Dobashi Station (Hiroshima), a tram stop of Hiroshima Electric Railway in Hiroshima, Hiroshima Prefecture, Japan